Wang Chin-Fang (born 5 July 1983) is a Taiwanese judoka, who competed for the light middleweight category at the 2008 Summer Olympics in Beijing. She is a two-time defending champion for her category at the 2007 Summer Universiade in Bangkok, Thailand, and at the 2009 Summer Universiade in Belgrade, Serbia. She also won two medals each at the Asian Games and at the Asian Judo Championships.

At the 2008 Summer Olympics, Wang reached the quarterfinal round of the women's 63 kg class, where she was lost to Cuba's Driulis González, who scored a yuko within the closing time of five minutes. Wang qualified for the repechage bout, with a possible chance of capturing an Olympic bronze medal; however, she was narrowly defeated in the second round, with an automatic ippon, scored by Austria's Claudia Heill.

References

External links
 
 NBC Olympics Profile

Taiwanese female judoka
1983 births
Living people
Olympic judoka of Taiwan
Judoka at the 2008 Summer Olympics
Asian Games medalists in judo
Judoka at the 2002 Asian Games
Judoka at the 2006 Asian Games
Judoka at the 2010 Asian Games
Asian Games silver medalists for Chinese Taipei
Asian Games bronze medalists for Chinese Taipei
Medalists at the 2002 Asian Games
Medalists at the 2010 Asian Games
Universiade medalists in judo
Universiade gold medalists for Chinese Taipei
Medalists at the 2007 Summer Universiade
Medalists at the 2009 Summer Universiade
21st-century Taiwanese women